Axyracrus is a genus of South American anyphaenid sac spiders containing the single species, Axyracrus elegans. It was  first described by Eugène Simon in 1884, and has only been found in Chile and Argentina. It is a senior synonym of "Schiapellia"

References

Anyphaenidae
Monotypic Araneomorphae genera
Spiders of South America
Taxa named by Eugène Simon